King Edward's School (KES) is an independent day school for boys in the British public school tradition, located in Edgbaston, Birmingham. Founded by King Edward VI in 1552, it is part of the Foundation of the Schools of King Edward VI in Birmingham. It is a member of the Headmasters' and Headmistresses' Conference. As of 2021, King Edward's School was ranked as one of the top 10 International Baccalaureate schools in the United Kingdom and amongst the top 25 in the world.  In 2020, the Tatler School Guide described the school as “academically elite,” going on to note that it is “in the process of upping its already sky-high intellectual ante [...] with top-of-the-range sporting facilities and a raft of extracurricular activities [...] it comes as no surprise that leavers head off to a shining constellation of universities.”

It shares its site and is twinned with King Edward VI High School for Girls (KEHS). Whilst the two schools are managed separately, dramatic arts, societies, music and other events are often shared; the schools also share a couple of hockey pitches and several clubs. The shared area is called Winterbourne after the nearby Winterbourne Botanic Garden.

Alumni of the school include two Nobel laureates, as well as J. R. R. Tolkien, author of The Lord of the Rings, and Field Marshal William Slim, 1st Viscount Slim, British military commander in Burma during the Second World War.

History

The Foundation was created on 2 January 1552 by Royal Charter of King Edward VI together with £20 per annum returned by the Crown for educational purposes. Five years earlier in 1547 the Act of Suppression, part of the wider Dissolution of the Monasteries, provided for the confiscation of all assets of religious guilds except an amount of land with an annual income of £21 (two thirds of the original lands) if the guild supported a school. The Guild of the Holy Cross in Birmingham had no school, but persuaded the Earl of Northumberland (also the lord of the manor of Birmingham) to release the land for the creation of a school. The charter of the "free Grammer Schole" of King Edward VI was issued on 2 January 1552, and the school came into being in the former guild building on New Street. By the 1680s there were "neer 200" boys in the school and a Petty School (a feeder school) had been established by the foundation.

The affairs of the school in the early part of the 18th century were dominated by a quarrel between a governor and the headmaster, but this notwithstanding, a new Georgian-inspired building was built on the New Street site between 1731 and 1734. In the latter part of the 18th Century four separate elementary schools and a girls' school were set up by the Foundation of the Schools of King Edward VI. The school remained relatively stagnant after this until Francis Jeune was appointed Headmaster in 1835. He erected a new building on the same site, in the Gothic Revival style of architecture. This was designed by Charles Barry, who employed Augustus Welby Northmore Pugin for aspects of the interior design, generally held to be Big School and, less certainly, the decorative battlements. (Barry, again employing Pugin, subsequently designed the present Palace of Westminster). From within this new landmark building came several changes in the curriculum and ethos of the school. Sports became an important feature, through games afternoons, and the dominance of Classics was lessened by the introduction of mathematics and science.

By 1936 the old building on New Street had become a fire risk, and soot from the nearby train station was also an issue. The school also did not have any nearby space for sports, and had to travel to the playing fields near the present-day school. As a result, plans were made by the Governors and the then Headmaster, Edwin Thirlwall England, to move to a new site at Edgbaston Park Road/Bristol Road, in Edgbaston, along with the girls' school. At the time this new site was in the countryside, along with the nearby university. Ironically, the temporary buildings erected on the new site in 1936 burnt down. The school was forced to move, if only for a short time, to the University of Birmingham's Great Hall and surrounding buildings until new temporary buildings could be erected. The move was complicated by the outbreak of the Second World War, and the subsequent evacuation of the pupils to Repton School for a short period. By 1940 enough of the new buildings designed by Holland W. Hobbiss had been built for the school to begin lessons. In 1945 the schools became direct grant grammar schools, which meant that the Governors had to relinquish some control over the running of the school. The schools were finally completed around 1948, although the 1950s saw a period of expansion under the Chief Master Ronald G. Lunt, appointed 1952, including the construction of a swimming pool and the building of a chapel from a specially salvaged portion of the upper corridor of the New Street building. In 1976 the two schools became, once again, independent schools, due to the termination of the Direct Grant scheme by the then Prime Minister Harold Wilson. The school remains independent and is still on the Edgbaston site.

In 2010 the school replaced A levels with the International Baccalaureate diploma.

In 2012, the Independent review of A-level and IB results, based on government-issued statistics, ranked King Edward's School 9th in the UK, ahead of Westminster (17th), St Paul's (22nd), Harrow (34th), Winchester (73rd) and Eton (80th).

When schools were closed on 20 March 2020 due to the COVID-19 pandemic, the school relocated its education to online learning via Zoom.

School buildings

The chapel

The chapel, a Grade II* listed building, was originally part of the upper corridor of the 1838 New Street school (built by Charles Barry). It was moved brick by brick to Edgbaston (1938–1940) by Holland W. Hobbiss, and renovated and rebuilt in the 1950s.

The Cinema Museum in London holds extensive film of the old school being demolished in February 1936.

On Wednesday 4 May 2016, King Edward's School officially opened the second phase of its First World War exhibition in the chapel, originally opened in 2014, to commemorate the centenary of the Battle of the Somme.

Sapientia
Another glory of the school, the great desk of the Chief Master, with "Sapientia" (wisdom) inscribed over it, survives from Barry's New Street school, and is still in daily use in Big School. This too is generally thought to be the work of Pugin.

School structure
Unlike state secondary schools and in common with many independent schools, King Edward's does not use modern year group names habitually, e.g. Year 11, Year 12, etc.

The table below attempts to clarify the names of forms used for the different years:

The House System

King Edward's has a house system, instigated in 1902 by the then Headmaster, Robert Cary Gilson. Originally, there were four houses, using the colours Blue, Green, Red and Yellow, but the houses were known simply by the name of the Housemaster at any one time ("Mr Soandso's House"), involving a change of name whenever the Housemaster changed. In 1951 the number of Houses was enlarged to eight, and it was decided that they should have permanent names. Six were called after former Headmasters, and two after assistant masters (Rawdon Levett and C. H. Heath). The colours of each house are shown on this table, though that for Levett was formerly brown.

Extracurricular activities

Sport
There are three main sports at KES; rugby and hockey in the winter and cricket in the summer. Hockey is available as an option from first year (Shells) onwards.
In the first and second years (Shells and Removes), there are up to six fully coached rugby teams, but from the third year there are only three. Other boys practise hockey, basketball, fencing, swimming and other sports. Boys at this school can choose to focus on the sports they excel on if they excel particularly outstandingly.

The rugby match against KES's main rival, Bromsgrove School, is the highlight of the rugby season, has been played annually since 1875, and is the oldest annual schools fixture in England. KES is also a keen rival of Solihull School and Warwick School, both fixtures dating back a hundred or more years. The school runs a rugby tour to a major rugby-playing country every two years, the tour being open only to the 1st and 2nd teams of that year.

The water polo team has won the English Schools Under-19 Water Polo competition in 2002 and 2008, the latter win being accompanied by the Warwickshire Cup. Numerous players have been called to the City of Birmingham Youth Squad and English Schools Water Polo teams. The school runs a water polo tour every so often, with the most recent tour in Cyprus taking place from 23 to 29 October 2019.

The house system encourages participation in sport outside the weekly sports sessions. With autumn and winter competitions in rugby, hockey, tennis etc., pupils have the opportunity to participate in team competitions. In the summer, house activities such as the school's athletics competition, cross country races and house swimming allow further sporting pursuits. The school makes use of its extensive sporting facilities, which include a swimming pool, AstroTurf pitches, tennis courts, numerous rugby and cricket pitches (including additional training areas), an athletics track, a sports hall, squash courts and Eton Fives courts.

The school also competes in national competitions of a more intellectual nature including chess, Schools' Challenge (general knowledge) and debating.

Music and drama

There is a separate building on site housing the Music Department, with facilities including a recital/rehearsal auditorium and a computer laboratory equipped with keyboard input. In addition, the school supports two full orchestras (in association with King Edward's High School for Girls) the more advanced of which has performed such works as Dvořák's Symphony No. 9, "From the New World". There are also two wind/brass ensembles in association with KEHS, and the senior members of both schools can join the Choral Society, a choir of 80-100 people which has sung such works as Carl Orff's Carmina Burana and Karl Jenkins's The Armed Man. KES also has its own choir, which sings at the Christmas carol service held in St Philip's Cathedral in the centre of Birmingham, and at the Christmas and summer concerts. The school holds four concerts every year: three at the school site and one in the summer at the Symphony Hall, Birmingham. The Drama Society at KES/KEHS performs a junior play, senior play or musical, and syndicate play (organised solely by pupils) and participates in the Shakespeare Schools Festival (for pupils in the Fourths and Fifths).

In 2012 the school built a new Performing Arts Centre, of which the main space is the Ruddock Hall which accommodates an orchestra of 90, audience of over 400 and a drama studio of flexible design that accommodates an audience of 120. The centre also houses a studio designed specifically for dance which benefits from panoramic open views across Winterbourne Gardens. Commissioned by Sir Paul Ruddock, a former pupil of the school, the facility was officially opened by the Rt Hon Michael Gove on 13 April 2012. The concert hall of the Ruddock Performing Arts Centre hosts the school's Senior and Junior Productions, Dance Production and three concerts throughout the year. The smaller drama studio hosts the more minor productions, such as the Middle School Drama Club.

Visits and expeditions

In the Shells boys take part in a three-day camping trip in Staffordshire, cooking their own evening meals. In the Removes each form has a five-day youth hostel visit in the Lake District or Snowdonia. This is alongside individual department field trips, such as annual Geography, History and Biology field trips along with exchanges with foreign pupils.

There are also a few hill-walking, caving and climbing trips for boys in the lower years.

The annual expeditions programme includes cycle tours, visits to Jordan, Ardèche adventure weeks in France, ski and snow-shoeing trips, and visits to Normandy and the Bay of Naples. The school has operated annual cycle tours since 1995. Past tours have included Sustrans routes such as the Coast to Coast and Hull to Felixstowe. The school has toured on three occasions from Land's End to John O'Groats. Cycle tours abroad include the Kingfisher Trail in Ireland, a tour in Normandy, the Golden Circle in the Netherlands, and most recently from Dunkerque in France to IJmuiden in the Netherlands.

CCF and Duke of Edinburgh's Award

King Edward's School has had a Combined Cadet Force (CCF) since 1906 (originally Officers Training Corps, then Junior Training Corps, 1940–48); it is a voluntary organisation. The CCF comprises: the Royal Navy section, the Army section, and the Royal Air Force section which was terminated in 2014 but was started again in 2016. The CCF conduct their training on Friday afternoons, and expeditions take place throughout the year. The RN section is currently affiliated to HMS Daring, along with several other organisations in the Midlands. The RAF Section is affiliated with No. 8 Air Experience Flight which is based at RAF Cosford.

The contingent is part of 143 West Midlands Brigade, and the contingent are represented at the Brigade competitions by members of all three sections. In 2006 the contingent won all the matches at the CCF Skill at Arms competition, the Military Skills competition and various first aid titles. The CCF is closely linked with the Duke of Edinburgh's Award scheme within the school. In 2006 KES CCF celebrated its centenary Review; the Inspecting Officer was the then Second Sea Lord, Vice Admiral Adrian Johns.

The CCF train on Friday afternoons, on the school site for the majority of the year, although each section may go elsewhere occasionally for specific activities, and weekend activities and expeditions take place at various military bases around the country. The school has a 25m indoor Firing Range on which cadets from all sections fire the .22 No.8 rifle. To shoot the larger, semi-automatic L98 rifle, cadets must fire on ranges on real military bases. Royal Navy cadets frequently spend Friday afternoons sailing or kayaking at the local Edgbaston Reservoir.

In 2014, the RAF section was disbanded due to a lack of staff as well as for various other reasons. The final Annual General Inspection of the CCF with the RAF section present was held on 4 July 2014, and was attended by Air Marshal Barry North as the Inspecting Officer, as well as a number of other officers from each section. However, the RAF section was restarted in September 2015 and has recently competed in the Royal Air Squadron Trophy (RAST). On a weekly basis, it involves itself in leadership tasks; first aid tasks and general military skills such as drill and uniform presentation.

Previously, the school operated the Duke of Edinburgh's Award at Bronze, Silver and Gold Level; since September 2012, only the Gold award is offered and only for senior students. Instead the school holds their own awards scheme - the KES Expeditions Award.

Clubs and societies

There is a range of around 40 groups, clubs and societies at the school, including: Agora Society (philosophy), The Edwardian Herald, the school newspaper and magazine written by students, The Medical Society, Engineering Society (STEM), Movie Club (movies, franchises, ‘TV shows’, reviews and theories), Visual Media Society (films, television and the industry), Junior and Senior Debating Societies, Literary Society, Dramatic Society, Amnesty International Society, Classic Film Society, Model United Nations, Programming Club, Scientific Society, Book Club and Archery. The school also had a Living History (historical re-enactment) society, which stopped in 2018. There are drama clubs for every year, with years 7 and 8 having their own; with years 9 & 10 participating in 'Middle School Drama Club'.  The mentoring society, with the aim of helping pupils in their studies, runs weekly under the supervision of the Learning Support co-ordinator.  Along with the Edwardian Herald, in the more recent years, there has been the opening of the Block magazine which is a submission-based magazine where pupils can submit their writings to have it published so fellow pupils may see it as well.

Another also recently made club is Clef club which is a club made for aspiring composers who would like to develop their own pieces of music with the guidance of the new Director of Music, Dr Martin Leigh.

Boys can also compete in the Schools Challenge competition, with King Edward's having won the National Competition in 2011. The Schools' Challenge team has secured regular victories in regional competitions such as the Lord Mayor's Quiz, coming 1st in three consecutive years from 2019-21.

King Edward's has flourishing debating teams which participate in competitive tournaments at venues like the Oxford, Cambridge and Durham Unions. It was the first (and so far only) school to retain the Cambridge Union Schools' Debating title (2000 and 2001).

School songs
There are two school songs:

King Edward's School Song
Written by Alfred Hayes (1857–1936), an Old Edwardian; composed by A. Somervell and first sung by Jerome O'Neill in 1937.
A rousing song, sung mainly at the end of term. The boys usually place particular emphasis on the final words of the first line of the chorus by often shouting "SOME TO FAME!" 
Much is made of the fact that the school song is sung in English, as opposed to the Latin of Eton and Rugby.
The song is composed of four verses, with the chorus sung after each one.
The Quatercentenary Song
Written in Latin by Roger Dunt (1900–63), senior classics master; composed by Willis Grant (1907–81), music master
Sung at Founder's Day, the annual commemoration in October of King Edward's birthday, and at the school's Speech Day. It is also sung at various other award ceremonies. An extra verse was written for the visit of Queen Elizabeth II on 3 November 1955 (replacing a visit planned for the quatercentenary year 1952 by King George VI).

King Edward's in modern literature
In the mid-20th century the school produced two authors who used their time at school as the basis for autobiographical work.

David Rudkin's TV film Penda's Fen alludes frequently to aspects of school life in the early 1950s. This includes dwelling on the Chief Master's rostrum "Sapientia" (see above) and the direct use of some personal surnames of staff and pupils from that period. Scenes involving the Combined Cadet Force, a central theme in the film, recreate the atmosphere of the school at that time. Rudkin (OE c1947-1954) has published ambivalent views of his time at the school.

Jonathan Coe's novel The Rotters' Club was begun while he was at KES, and he said that the background detail of the school (renamed King William's) and the Birmingham suburbs came from his own life.

The School is also referenced in Tolkien, a 2019 film that focuses on Tolkien’s earlier years as a student at King Edward’s and Oxford:

Mrs Faulkner: King Edward's? That's a very good school.

Father Francis Morgan: Well, they're very bright boys, Mrs. Faulkner. Very diligent. After Africa, their mother home-schooled them, and they are now fluent in many languages.

Mrs Faulkner: Yes, but I mean socially. You boys will be mixing with the cream of Birmingham's bonnes familles. And quite a change from Africa, I shouldn't wonder. They've been living in England far longer than they ever were in Bloemfontein. Isn't that right, boys?

J.R.R. Tolkien: Yes, we hardly ever carry our spears anymore.

Notable former pupils

Former pupils of King Edward's School, Birmingham are known as Old Edwardians (OEs). A number of pupils have achieved prominence across various academic and sporting fields as well as in public service. Alumni of the school include two Nobel laureates, and J. R. R. Tolkien, author of The Lord of the Rings and The Hobbit.

In Science, Sir Maurice Wilkins was awarded the 1962 Nobel Prize for Physiology or Medicine. Most famous for discovering the structure of DNA, along with Watson and Crick, his research contributed to the scientific understanding of phosphorescence, isotope separation, optical microscopy and X-ray diffraction, and to the development of radar. Twenty years later, another pupil of the school,  Sir John Vane shared the 1982 Nobel Prize for Medicine for "discoveries concerning prostaglandins and related biologically active substances". Similarly, Richard Borcherds, was the winner of the Fields Medal (mathematical equivalent of the Nobel Prize). Finally, Harry Boot, physicist, was the co-developer of the cavity magnetron.

There have been a number of public service and military figures who were pupils at the school. Field Marshal William Slim, 1st Viscount Slim, was Commander of the successful Burma Campaign against the Japanese during the Second World War and later Chief of the Imperial General Staff (CIGS). Similarly, Lieutenant Colonel John Augustus Conolly, won the Victoria Cross (VC) at the Siege of Sevastopol in the Crimean War, becoming the only winner of the VC from the school. Sir Colin Figures, was Head of MI6 and played a distinguished role during the Falklands War. Another alumnus, Enoch Powell, remains an influential albeit controversial figure in British politics, serving in various Ministerial positions between 1957 and 1968, when he was sacked by Conservative Party leader Edward Heath for his "Rivers of Blood" speech. The first Mayor of the West Midlands, Andy Street CBE, also attended King Edward's.

In business, Sir Paul Ruddock, a hedge fund manager who served as chairman of the Victoria and Albert Museum, chairman of the University of Oxford Endowment, and co.founder and CEO of Lansdowne Partners, an alternative investment management firm, was an alumnus of the school. Similarly, James Quincey, the current chairman and CEO of the Coca-Cola Company,  is also a former pupil of the school. Other alumni include Tony Hall, Baron Hall of Birkenhead, former Director General of the BBC, and Peter Williams, co-founder and CEO of Jack Wills.

Within the Arts, Sir Edward Burne-Jones, 1st Baronet was one of the most pre-eminent artists of the Pre-Raphaelite movement. James Dover Grant CBE (known by his pen name Lee Child), is a British author who writes thriller novels, and is best known for his Jack Reacher novel series. Jonathan Coe based his novel The Rotters' Club (2001) on his time at the school.

A number of sporting figures were pupils of the school including Alan Smith, England Test cricketer (England, Warwickshire and Oxford University), first CEO of the Test and County Cricket Board (TCCB).

Chief masters
The head teacher was referred to as "Head Master" until 1952, when the newly appointed R. G. Lunt adopted the title "Chief Master", the title that has been used ever since.

The following have served as Head or Chief Masters:

Head Masters

 1561–1583 Thomas Buther
 1583–1599 William Woodall
 1599–1637 Richard Billingsley
 1640–1645 
 1645–1649 John Thompson 
 1654–1685 Nathaniel Brokesby
 1685–1692 John Hickes
 1693–1722 James Parkinson
 1722–1726 John Hausted
 1726–1746 Edward Mainwaring
 1746–1759 John Wilkinson
 1759–1766 Thomas Green
 1766–1775 John Brailsford
 1776–1797 Thomas Price
 1797–1834 John Cooke
 1834–1838 Francis Jeune
 1838–1848 James Prince Lee
 1848–1862 Edwin Hamilton Gifford
 1862–1872 Charles Evans
 1872–1900 Albert Richard Vardy
 1900–1929 Robert Cary Gilson
 1929–1941 Edwin Thirlwall England
 1942–1948 Charles Richard Morris
 1948–1952 Thomas Edward Brodie Howarth

Chief Masters

 1952–1974 Ronald Geoffrey Lunt
 1974–1982 Francis George Robson Fisher
 1982–1991 Martin John Wyndham Rogers
 1991–1998 Hugh Wright
 1998–2005 Roger Dancey
 2006–2016 John Claughton
 2016–2018 Mark Fenton
 2018–2019 Keith Phillips
 2019– Catherine Ricks

Notes

References

External links
 
 The Foundation of King Edward the Sixth in Birmingham

 King Edward's School - Charles Barry's Building (1838-1936), New Street, Birmingham
 Robert Darleston King Edward's School Birmingham 1951–1959

Boys' schools in the West Midlands (county)
Educational institutions established in the 1550s
Private schools in Birmingham, West Midlands
International Baccalaureate schools in England
1552 establishments in England
Grade II* listed buildings in Birmingham
Member schools of the Headmasters' and Headmistresses' Conference
Edgbaston
Schools with a royal charter
Grade II* listed educational buildings
King Edward VI Schools
Charles Barry buildings